Inositol trisphosphate or inositol 1,4,5-trisphosphate abbreviated InsP3 or Ins3P or IP3 is an inositol phosphate signaling molecule. It is made by hydrolysis of phosphatidylinositol 4,5-bisphosphate (PIP2), a phospholipid that is located in the plasma membrane, by phospholipase C (PLC).
Together with diacylglycerol (DAG), IP3 is a second messenger molecule used in signal transduction in biological cells. While DAG stays inside the membrane, IP3 is soluble and diffuses through the cell, where it binds to its receptor, which is a calcium channel located in the endoplasmic reticulum. When IP3 binds its receptor, calcium is released into the cytosol, thereby activating various calcium regulated intracellular signals.

Properties

Chemical formula and molecular weight
IP3 is an organic molecule with a molecular mass of 420.10 g/mol. Its empirical formula is C6H15O15P3. It is composed of an inositol ring with three phosphate groups bound at the 1, 4, and 5 carbon positions, and three hydroxyl groups bound at positions 2, 3, and 6.

Chemical properties 
Phosphate groups can exist in three different forms depending on a solution's pH. Phosphorus atoms can bind three oxygen atoms with single bonds and a fourth oxygen atom using a double/dative bond. The pH of the solution, and thus the form of the phosphate group determines its ability to bind to other molecules. The binding of phosphate groups to the inositol ring is accomplished by phosphor-ester binding (see phosphoric acids and phosphates). This bond involves combining a hydroxyl group from the inositol ring and a free phosphate group through a dehydration reaction. Considering that the average physiological pH is approximately 7.4, the main form of the phosphate groups bound to the inositol ring in vivo is PO42−. This gives IP3 a net negative charge, which is important in allowing it to dock to its receptor, through binding of the phosphate groups to positively charged residues on the receptor. IP3 has three hydrogen bond donors in the form of its three hydroxyl groups. The hydroxyl group on the 6th carbon atom in the inositol ring is also involved in IP3 docking.

Binding to its receptor

The docking of IP3 to its receptor, which is called the inositol trisphosphate receptor (InsP3R), was first studied using deletion mutagenesis in the early 1990s. Studies focused on the N-terminus side of the IP3 receptor. In 1997 researchers localized the region of the IP3 receptor involved with binding of IP3 to between amino acid residues 226 and 578 in 1997. Considering that IP3 is a negatively charged molecule, positively charged amino acids such as arginine and lysine were believed to be involved. Two arginine residues at position 265 and 511 and one lysine residue at position 508 were found to be key in IP3 docking. Using a modified form of IP3, it was discovered that all three phosphate groups interact with the receptor, but not equally. Phosphates at the 4th and 5th positions interact more extensively than the phosphate at the 1st position and the hydroxyl group at the 6th position of the inositol ring.

Discovery
The discovery that a hormone can influence phosphoinositide metabolism was made by Mabel R. Hokin (1924–2003) and her then husband Lowell E. Hokin in 1953, when they discovered that radioactive 32P phosphate was incorporated into the phosphatidylinositol of pancreas slices when stimulated with acetylcholine. Up until then phospholipids were believed to be inert structures only used by cells as building blocks for construction of the plasma membrane.

Over the next 20 years, little was discovered about the importance of PIP2 metabolism in terms of cell signaling, until the mid-1970s when Robert H. Michell hypothesized a connection between the catabolism of PIP2 and increases in intracellular calcium (Ca2+) levels. He hypothesized that receptor-activated hydrolysis of PIP2 produced a molecule that caused increases in intracellular calcium mobilization. This idea was researched extensively by Michell and his colleagues, who in 1981 were able to show that PIP2 is hydrolyzed into DAG and IP3 by a then unknown phosphodiesterase. In 1984 it was discovered that IP3 acts as a secondary messenger that is capable of traveling through the cytoplasm to the endoplasmic reticulum (ER), where it stimulates the release of calcium into the cytoplasm.

Further research provided valuable information on the IP3 pathway, such as the discovery in 1986 that one of the many roles of the calcium released by IP3 is to work with DAG to activate protein kinase C (PKC). It was discovered in 1989 that phospholipase C (PLC) is the phosphodiesterase responsible for hydrolyzing PIP2 into DAG and IP3. Today the IP3 signaling pathway is well mapped out, and is known to be important in regulating a variety of calcium-dependent cell signaling pathways.

Signaling pathway

Increases in the intracellular Ca2+ concentrations are often a result of IP3 activation. When a ligand binds to a G protein-coupled receptor (GPCR) that is coupled to a Gq heterotrimeric G protein, the α-subunit of Gq can bind to and induce activity in the PLC isozyme PLC-β, which results in the cleavage of PIP2 into IP3 and DAG.

If a receptor tyrosine kinase (RTK) is involved in activating the pathway, the isozyme PLC-γ has tyrosine residues that can become phosphorylated upon activation of an RTK, and this will activate PLC-γ and allow it to cleave PIP2 into DAG and IP3. This occurs in cells that are capable of responding to growth factors such as insulin, because the growth factors are the ligands responsible for activating the RTK.

IP3 (also abbreviated Ins(1,4,5)P3 is a soluble molecule and is capable of diffusing through the cytoplasm to the ER, or the sarcoplasmic reticulum (SR) in the case of muscle cells, once it has been produced by the action of PLC. Once at the ER, IP3 is able to bind to the Ins(1,4,5)P3 receptor Ins(1,4,5)P3R which is a ligand-gated Ca2+ channel that is found on the surface of the ER. The binding of IP3 (the ligand in this case) to Ins(1,4,5)P3R triggers the opening of the Ca2+ channel, and thus release of Ca2+ into the cytoplasm. In heart muscle cells this increase in Ca2+ activates the ryanodine receptor-operated channel on the SR, results in further increases in Ca2+ through a process known as calcium-induced calcium release. IP3 may also activate Ca2+ channels on the cell membrane indirectly, by increasing the intracellular Ca2+ concentration.

Function

Human

IP3's main functions are to mobilize Ca2+ from storage organelles and to regulate cell proliferation and other cellular reactions that require free calcium. In smooth muscle cells, for example, an increase in concentration of cytoplasmic Ca2+ results in the contraction of the muscle cell.

In the nervous system, IP3 serves as a second messenger, with the cerebellum containing the highest concentration of IP3 receptors. There is evidence that IP3 receptors play an important role in the induction of plasticity in cerebellar Purkinje cells.

Sea urchin eggs 
The slow block to polyspermy in the sea urchin is mediated by the PIP2 secondary messenger system. Activation of the binding receptors activates PLC, which cleaves PIP2 in the egg plasma membrane, releasing IP3 into the egg cell cytoplasm. IP3 diffuses to the ER, where it opens Ca2+ channels.

Research

Huntington's disease
Huntington's disease occurs when the cytosolic protein Huntingtin (Htt) has an additional 35 glutamine residues added to its amino terminal region. This modified form of Htt is called Httexp. Httexp makes Type 1 IP3 receptors more sensitive to IP3, which leads to the release of too much Ca2+ from the ER. The release of Ca2+ from the ER causes an increase in the cytosolic and mitochondrial concentrations of Ca2+. This increase in Ca2+ is thought to be the cause of GABAergic MSN degradation.

Alzheimer's disease
Alzheimer's disease involves the progressive degeneration of the brain, severely impacting mental faculties. Since the Ca2+ hypothesis of Alzheimer's was proposed in 1994, several studies have shown that disruptions in Ca2+ signaling are the primary cause of Alzheimer's disease. Familial Alzheimer's disease has been strongly linked to mutations in the presenilin 1 (PS1), presenilin 2 (PS2), and amyloid precursor protein (APP) genes. All of the mutated forms of these genes observed to date have been found to cause abnormal Ca2+ signaling in the ER. Mutations in PS1 have been shown to increase IP3-mediated Ca2+ release from the ER in several animal models. Calcium channel blockers have been used to treat Alzheimer's disease with some success, and the use of  lithium to decrease IP3 turnover has also been suggested as a possible method of treatment.

See also

 Adenophostin
 Inositol
 Inositol phosphate
 myo-Inositol
 Myo-inositol trispyrophosphate
 Inositol pentakisphosphate
 Inositol hexaphosphate
 Inositol trisphosphate receptor
 ITPR1
 ITPKC

References

External links
 

Signal transduction
Inositol
Phosphate esters
Second messenger system